Balaskaleh (also known as Balaskaleh-ye Chūkām) is a village in Chukam Rural District, Khomam District, Rasht County, Gilan Province, Iran. At the 2006 census, its population was 1,077, in 300 families.

References 

Populated places in Rasht County